Olivia Taylor Dudley is an American actress. She is known for her horror film roles such as Chernobyl Diaries (2012), The Vatican Tapes (2015) and Paranormal Activity: The Ghost Dimension (2015), for her television roles such as the Syfy fantasy series The Magicians, and for her work in the internet sketch group 5-Second Films.

Early life
Dudley was born in Morro Bay, California.

Career 
Dudley earned her first major film role in the 2012 thriller Chernobyl Diaries. In 2013, she was cast in the 2015 demonic possession drama film The Vatican Tapes playing the possession victim Angela Holmes; Dudley's portrayal in the film earned positive notice from The New York Times reviewer Nicolas Rapold. Dudley's other notable movies include Chillerama, Paranormal Activity: The Ghost Dimension, Dumbbells, The Barber, and Dude Bro Party Massacre III.

Dudley's television roles include appearances on CSI: Miami and Arrested Development. In August 2015, she earned the regular role of Alice in Syfy's drama fantasy series The Magicians. In mid 2016, Dudley guest-starred opposite David Duchovny in the second season of NBC's Aquarius.

Filmography

References

External links

American film actresses
American television actresses
Living people
21st-century American actresses
People from Morro Bay, California
Actresses from California
Year of birth missing (living people)